Otakar Hostinský (2 January 1847, Martiněves (near Litoměřice) – 19 January 1910, Prague) was a Czech historian, musicologist, and professor of musical aesthetics.  He is known primarily for his support of composer Bedřich Smetana and his contributions to Czech aesthetic theory, which influenced many cultural figures in early twentieth-century Prague, including Zdeněk Nejedlý, Otakar Zich, and Vladimír Helfert. He also wrote the opera librettos to Zdeněk Fibich's masterpiece, The Bride of Messina, and Josef Rozkošný's Cinderella.

Biography

Selected writings
(German titles given in the original; Czech titles translated into English)

 Art and Nationality, 1869
 Wagnerianism and Czech National Identity, 1870
 On "Program" Music, 1873
 Das Musikalisch-Schöne und das Gesammtkunstwerk vom Standpuncte der formalen Aesthetik, 1877
 Die Lehre von den musikalischen Klängen, 1879
 On the Contemporary State and Direction of Czech Music, 1880
 On Czech Musical Declamation, 1882
 On Melodrama, 1885
 A Brief Overview of the History of Music, 1885
 On Artistic Realism, 1890
 Herbarts Ästhetik, 1891
 Volkslied und Tanz der Slaven, 1893
 On Progress in Art, 1894
 On Folksong, 1897
 On Experimental Aesthetics, 1900
 B. Smetana and his Struggle for Modern Czech Music, 1901
 On the Socialization of Art, 1903
 Art and Society, 1907
 Czech Music, 1864-1904, 1909

References

1847 births
1910 deaths
People from Litoměřice District
Czech musicologists
Czech opera librettists
Czech male writers
20th-century Czech historians
Czech philosophers
19th-century Czech historians